Notario is a surname. Notable people with the surname include:
Antonio Notario (born 1972), Spanish footballer
Hugo Notario (born 1980), Argentine-born Paraguayan footballer